Allium barsczewskii is a plant species native to Kazakhstan, Kyrgyzstan, Uzbekistan, Tajikistan, Iran, Afghanistan and Pakistan. It is about 50 cm tall with pink flowers.

References

barsczewskii
Onions
Flora of temperate Asia
Plants described in 1900